Supreme Immortal Art is the fourth studio album release by black metal band Abigor. It was released in 1998.

Track listing 
 "Satan in Me" - 6:19
 "Supreme Immortal Art" - 5:03
 "Soil of Souls" - 4:29
 "Eclipse My Heart, Crown Me King" - 4:41
 "The Spirit of Venus" - 5:58
 "Blood and Soil" - 4:47
 "Magic Glass Monument" - 5:52
 "Exhausted Remains" - 3:50

 

1998 albums
Abigor albums
Napalm Records albums